The 1986–87 FC Porto season of the Portuguese Football Club FC Porto, based in Porto, Portugal.

Season summary
Porto won the European Cup for the first time in their history.

First-team squad
Squad at end of season

Competitions

Supertaça Cândido de Oliveira

Primeira Divisão

League table

Matches
Porto 2-2 Benfica
Vitoria Guimaraes 2-2 Porto
Porto 3-0 Desportivo Chaves
Rio Ave 0-0 Porto
Porto 4-0 Salgueiros
Academica 1-3 Porto
Porto 5-0 Portimonense
Belenenses 0-3 Porto
Porto 2-0 Sporting CP
Sporting Braga 0-1 Porto
Boavista 1-1 Porto
Porto 0-0 Varzim
Maritimo 1-4 Porto
Porto 8-3 Farense
O Elvas 0-2 Porto
Benfica 3-1 Porto
Porto 2-2 Vitoria Guimaraes
Desportivo Chaves 1-2 Porto
Porto 3-0 Rio Ave
Salgueiros 0-3 Porto
Porto 1-0 Academica
Portimonense 1-0 Porto
Porto 1-0 Belenenses
Sporting CP 2-0 Porto
Porto 3-1 Sporting Braga
Porto 2-1 Boavista
Varzim 0-2 Porto
Porto 1-0 Maritimo
Farense 1-0 Porto
Porto 6-0 O Elvas

Taça de Portugal

Round of 128
Porto 6-0 Salgueiros

Round of 64
Estarreja 1-4 Porto

Round of 32
Porto 5-0 Samora Correia

Round of 16
Sporting Covilha 0-2 Porto

Quarter-finals
Porto 5-0 Vitoria Guimaraes

Semi-finals
Porto 0-1 aet. Sporting CP

European Cup

First round

Second round

Quarter-finals

Semi-finals

Final

Statistics

Top scorers

Primeira Liga
 Fernando Gomes - 21

References

Porto
FC Porto seasons
UEFA Champions League-winning seasons